Kill Chain may refer to:

 Kill chain, a military concept about structured attacks, and later cyber attacks
 "Kill Chain", an episode of the television series NCIS
 Kill Chain (film), a 2019 film starring Nicolas Cage
 Kill Chain: The Cyber War on America's Elections (2020), a documentary film with Harri Hursti
 Kill Chain: Drones and the Rise of High-Tech Assassins, a 2015 book by Andrew Cockburn